Gardam is a surname. Notable people with the surname include:

Jane Gardam (born 1928), English writer
Tim Gardam (born 1956), British journalist, media executive and educator